Robert John McClory (born October 10, 1963) is an American prelate of the Catholic Church who has been serving as bishop of the Diocese of Gary in Indiana since 2019.

Biography

Early life 
Robert McClory was born in Detroit, Michigan, on October 10, 1963, the youngest of four children of James and Ann McClory. He attended grade school at St. Francis DeSales Parish in Detroit and St. Mary Parish in Royal Oak, Michigan. He graduated from George A. Dondero High School in Royal Oak. McClory earned a bachelor's degree in politics and communications from Oakland University. In 1987, he received a master's degree in public policy and administration from Columbia University in New York City and a Juris Doctor degree from the University of Michigan Law School in Ann Arbor, Michigan, in 1991.

After practicing civil law for three years, McClory entered Sacred Heart Major Seminary in Detroit. He continued as a seminarian at the Pontifical North American College in Rome. He obtained a Bachelor of Sacred Theology degree from the Pontifical Gregorian University and a Licentiate in Canon Law from the Pontifical University of St. Thomas Aquinas.  McClory is a third degree member of the Knights of Columbus and is a member of the Order of the Holy Sepulchre. McClory was ordained to the diaconate by Archbishop Edmund Szoka in St. Peter's Basilica, Rome, on October 8, 1998.

Priesthood 
McClory was ordained a priest for the Archdiocese of Detroit in Detroit by Cardinal Adam Maida on May 22, 1999. McClory served as associate pastor of St. Therese of Lisieux Parish in Shelby Township, Michigan and St. Isidore Parish in Macomb Township, Michigan.  He also performed weekend assignments at Our Lady of the Lakes in Waterford, Michigan; St. Blaise in Sterling Heights, Michigan; and St. Andrew parish in Rochester, Michigan.

McClory served as a judge on the Metropolitan Tribunal and was administrative secretary to Cardinal Maida before being appointed chancellor of the archdiocese in 2003.In 2005, he was named chaplain of his holiness by Pope Benedict XVI. In 2009, Archbishop Allen Vigneron appointed McClory as moderator of the curia and vicar general, where he served as chief of staff, coordinating the central offices of the archdiocese. During this time he also served as pastor of Presentation Our Lady of Victory Parish in Detroit. In 2017, McClory became pastor and rector of the National Shrine of the Little Flower Basilica in Royal Oak.

Bishop of Gary 
Pope Francis appointed McClory as the fifth bishop for the Diocese of Gary on November 26, 2019. On February 11, 2020, McClory was consecrated by Archbishop Charles C. Thompson. He succeeded Bishop Donald J. Hying.

See also

 Catholic Church hierarchy
 Catholic Church in the United States
 Historical list of the Catholic bishops of the United States
 List of Catholic bishops of the United States
 Lists of patriarchs, archbishops, and bishops

References

External links
Roman Catholic Diocese of Gary official website

Episcopal succession

 

1963 births
Living people
Clergy from Detroit
21st-century Roman Catholic bishops in the United States
University of Michigan Law School alumni
Bishops appointed by Pope Francis